The Petit Ballon or Little Belchen, is, at 1272m, one of the highest peaks of the Vosges Mountains in the department of Haut-Rhin, Alsace in France, about 5 km away from the village of Wasserbourg. The Rothenbrunnen mountain hut is 500m below. A car park is a further 500m away.

The Col du Petit Ballon pass (elevation ) is close to the summit.

The mountain is part of the Belchen System, a group of mountains with the name "Belchen" (in German) that may have been part of a Celtic sun calendar.

References

Bibliography 
 [https://books.google.com/books?id=0GjZTWkhFNQC&dq=%22Le+Petit+Ballon%22+mountain&pg=PT13 Alsace and Lorraine Rough Guides Snapshot France] Penguin, May 23, 2013
 A wayfarer in Alsace Bernard Stephen Townroe Houghton Mifflin, 1926
 Petit Futé Alsace Dominique Auzias, Jean-Paul Labourdette Petit Futé, Mar 3, 2010
 Trekking in the Vosges and Jura: the GR5, GR53 and other treks and walks. Les Smith, Elizabeth Smith Cicerone Press Limited, 2006
 Les plus beaux circuits en camping car 2014 Petit Futé (avec cartes, photos + avis des lecteurs)  Collectif, Petit Futé, Dominique Auzias, Jean-Paul Labourdette Petit Futé, Feb 7, 2014
 Alsace.  Hervé Lévy Petit Futé, 2009
 Alsace, Lorraine, Vosges.  Manufacture française des pneumatiques Michelin, Pneu Michelin, 1989

Mountains of the Vosges
One-thousanders of France
Mountains of Haut-Rhin